Events from the year 1806 in Canada.

Incumbents
Monarch: George III

Federal government
Parliament of Lower Canada: 4th 
Parliament of Upper Canada: 4th

Governors
Governor of the Canadas: Robert Milnes
Governor of New Brunswick: Thomas Carleton
Governor of Nova Scotia: John Wentworth
Commodore-Governor of Newfoundland: Erasmus Gower then John Holloway
Governor of Prince Edward Island: Joseph Frederick Wallet DesBarres

Events
 Minor trouble arises after 1806 when a governor attempts to anglicize Lower Canada, but he is able to quell dissent if not to achieve his goal.
 Russian-American Company Company collects otter pelts from Alaska to Spanish California.
 Mungo Park killed by natives on Niger River in Africa.
 On return trip John Colter is released from the Lewis and Clark Expedition to join Forrest Hancock and Joseph Dickson (Dixon) to trap the Yellowstone River.
 Le Canadien, a Quebec nationalist newspaper, is founded.

Births
April 12 – Peter Rindisbacher, painter (d.1834)
May 6 – Charles Dewey Day, lawyer, judge and politician (d.1884)
August 12 – George Ryan, politician (d.1876)
November 2 – Henry Kellett, officer in the Royal Navy, oceanographer, Arctic explorer (d.1875)
December 9 – Jean-Olivier Chénier, physician and Patriote (d.1837)

Deaths
 May 31: Louis Dunière, politician (b. 1723)
 July: Robert Gray, merchant sea-captain and explorer (b.1755)
 October 26: John Graves Simcoe, first lieutenant governor of Upper Canada (b.1752)
 December 31: Deborah Cottnam, schoolmistress and poet (b. c.1725–1728)

Historical documents
"Saakies" (Sauks?) and Potawatomi seek help against encroachment on their lands from U.S.A.; their request is deferred

Chief Joseph Brant asks to welcome new Upper Canada lieutenant governor with "leading chiefs and principal warriors" of Grand River

References 

 
Canada
06
1806 in North America